Route 79 may refer to:

London Buses route 79
Melbourne tram route 79
M79 (New York City bus), also referred to as the 79th Street bus
SEPTA Route 79, a former trolleybus line in South Philadelphia

See also
List of highways numbered 79

79